"Vajacki marš" ("March of the Warriors"), also known by its first line "My vyjdziem ščylnymi radami" ("Come, We Shall March in Joint Endeavour"), was the national anthem of the short-lived Belarusian Democratic Republic that existed from 1918 to 1919.

History

The lyrics of the song were first published in 1919 in Minsk, in the newspaper, Belarus. As the anthem of the Belarusian Democratic Republic, the song was approved in 1920, even though the republic was in exile at that time.

During the Soviet rule of Belarus, the song was banned. However, there were attempts to adapt the lyrics to the communist ideology by replacing mentions of the national Belarusian white-red-white flag with those of the Soviet red banner. Throughout the 20th century, the song was actively used by pro-independence organizations of the Belarusian diaspora.

After the restoration of the independence of Belarus in 1991, there were propositions to make Vajacki marš the national anthem of the Republic of Belarus once again. In particular, the renowned writers Vasil Bykau, Ales Adamovich and Ryhor Baradulin issued a public appeal in favour of making Vajacki marš the national anthem of Belarus. Other symbols of the Belarusian Democratic Republic, such as the Pahonia and the white-red-white flag, were restored as state symbols and used until 1995. The former anthem, however, was never restored as the country's national anthem, making the Anthem of the Byelorussian Soviet Socialist Republic retain its status as the official anthem, despite the restoration of the former symbols of independence. The retained anthem did not have any lyrics until 2002, when new lyrics replaced the Soviet-era ones.

Today, Vajacki marš enjoys certain popularity among the Belarusian democratic opposition and is traditionally mentioned as one of the possible alternatives to the current official anthem.

Lyrics

References

External links
Vocal recording of Vajacki marš
Instrumental recording of Vajacki marš

Belarusian National Republic
Historical national anthems
National symbols of Belarus
European anthems
Military music